Events from the 1230s in England.

Incumbents
Monarch – Henry III

Events
 1230
 3 May – King Henry III leads an army to France, and marches on Bordeaux.
 October – Henry returns to England.
 Devotional work Ancrene Wisse written.
 1231
 24 September – Ralph Neville enthroned as Archbishop of Canterbury.
 Henry fights a campaign against Llywelyn the Great in Wales.
 June – Llywelyn captures Cardigan Castle and defeats the English, forcing a truce.
 Peter des Roches, Bishop of Winchester, negotiates a 3-year truce with France.
 Simon de Montfort, 6th Earl of Leicester, expels the Jews from the city of Leicester which he controls.
 1232
 Pope Gregory IX quashes the election of Ralph Neville as Archbishop of Canterbury.
 16 March – John of Sittingbourne elected to the Archbishopric of Canterbury.
 12 June – John of Sittingbourne's election to the Archbishopric of Canterbury quashed.
 29 July – Henry III dismisses justiciar and regent Hubert de Burgh and replaces him with his Poitevin royal favourites Peter de Rivaux and Peter des Roches.
 26 August – John Blund elected to the Archbishopric of Canterbury.
 10 November – Hubert de Burgh is stripped of his offices and imprisoned for life.
 1233
 Peter des Roches takes control of the exchequer and the kingdom's finances.
 1 June – John Blund's election to the Archbishopric of Canterbury quashed.
 August – Richard Marshal, 3rd Earl of Pembroke allies with Llywelyn against Henry III.
 Stow Fair, Lincolnshire, inaugurated.
 A storm damages the port of Winchelsea.
 1234
 2 April – Pope Gregory IX consecrates Edmund Rich as Archbishop of Canterbury.
 16 April – Richard Marshal murdered, defending his estates against Henry's supporters.
 Peter de Rivaux and Peter des Roches fall from power.
 July – Llywelyn makes peace with Henry III, retaining control of Cardiganshire.
 2 December – a royal decree prohibits institutes of legal education within the City of London.
 Court of King's Bench established.
 1235
 15 July – marriage of Isabella of England to Frederick II, Holy Roman Emperor.
 August – five-year truce with France signed.
 Final conquest of Connacht in Ireland by the Hiberno-Norman Richard Mór de Burgh.
 The Statute of Merton, considered the first statute of the realm, is agreed at Merton between Henry III and the barons of England. It clarifies property rights and empowers secular courts to determine issues of legitimacy.
 Famine in England; 20,000 die in London.
 Probable date – Lancaster Royal Grammar School is founded.
 1236
 14 January – Henry III marries Eleanor of Provence.
 6 May – on the death of Roger of Wendover, Benedictine monk and chronicler of St Albans Abbey, the Chronica Majora is continued by Matthew Paris.
 A tournament at Tickhill in Yorkshire turns into a battle between northerners and southerners, but peace is restored by the papal legate.
 1237
 January – at the insistence of the barons, Henry enlarges the royal Council, in return for the imposition of a new tax.
 25 September – Treaty of York signed between Scotland and England establishes the border between the two countries.
 Henry III installs a leopard house at the Tower of London.
1237 or 1239 – the main tower of Lincoln Cathedral collapses.
 1238
 7 January – Simon de Montfort, 6th Earl of Leicester marries Eleanor, sister of Henry III.
 22 February – Henry III promises to make reforms demanded by the barons.
 1239
 23 October – Wells Cathedral dedicated.
 November – First record of Mabel of Bury St. Edmunds, embroiderer.

Births
 1231
John de Warenne, 6th Earl of Surrey (died 1304)
Roger Mortimer, 1st Baron Wigmore (died 1282)
 1238
 November – Henry de Montfort, son of Simon de Montfort, 6th Earl of Leicester (died 1265)
 1239
 17 June – King Edward I of England (died 1307)
 Approximate date – Robert Burnell, bishop and Lord Chancellor (died 1292)

Deaths
 1230
 25 October – Gilbert de Clare, 5th Earl of Gloucester, soldier (born 1180)
Nicolaa de la Haye, noblewoman and castellan (born 1150s)
 1231
 6 April – William Marshal, 2nd Earl of Pembroke (born 1190)
 1234
 16 April – Richard Marshal, 3rd Earl of Pembroke (year of birth unknown)
 1235
 7 February – Hugh of Wells, Bishop of Lincoln (year of birth unknown)
 1236
 6 May – Roger of Wendover, Benedictine monk and chronicler (year of birth unknown)
 1237
 15 April – Richard Poore, Bishop of Durham (translated from Salisbury) (year of birth unknown)
 1238
 4 March – Joan of England, Queen Consort of Scotland (born 1210)
 9 June – Peter des Roches, Bishop of Winchester (year of birth unknown)
 Hugh le Despenser, noble (year of birth unknown)
 1239
 21 December
 Henry de Turberville, noble and knight (year of birth unknown)
 Richard Wilton, scholastic philosopher (year of birth unknown)

References